The Battle of Polvoraria was a battle in 878 between troops of the Kingdom of Asturias under Alfonso III of Asturias and a Muslim army of the Emirate of Córdoba under Emir Muhammad I of Córdoba. It occurred near the confluence of the Orbigo and Esla rivers and was an Asturian victory.

Bibliography
 Sánchez-Albornoz, Claudio (1932). «La batalla de Polvoraria». Anales de la Universidad de Madrid I: 225–238.

870s conflicts
878
Battles involving the Kingdom of Asturias
Battles involving the Emirate of Córdoba
Battles of the Reconquista
9th century in Al-Andalus
History of the province of León
Battles in Castile and León